Balázs Villám (born 2 June 1989) is a Hungarian football player who currently plays for Iváncsa.

Club statistics

Updated to games played as of 29 November 2017.

References
 MLSZ
 HLSZ
 

1989 births
Living people
People from Kalocsa
Hungarian footballers
Association football defenders
Vasas SC players
Bajai LSE footballers
Dunaújváros PASE players
Szolnoki MÁV FC footballers
Zalaegerszegi TE players
Budapest Honvéd FC players
Nemzeti Bajnokság I players
Sportspeople from Bács-Kiskun County